Gholamreza Sabet Imani (born 6 April 2000) is an Iranian footballer who plays as a midfielder for Pars Jonoubi Jam in the Persian Gulf Pro League.

References

2000 births
Living people
Iranian footballers
Pars Jonoubi Jam players
Association football midfielders